True Blue – The Very Best of John Williamson is a compilation album by Australian country music artist John Williamson and was released in November 1995. The album was a celebration of 25 years in the music industry for Williamson. The album peaked at number 21 on the ARIA Charts and was certified 3× platinum in 2006.

Williamson released a book titled "True Blue" featuring Williamson's lyrics together with explanations as to how the songs came to be written. During the book's launch, Williamson is surprised by Mike Munro from Nine Network This Is Your Life to have his achievements recognized on the TV show.

At the ARIA Music Awards of 1996, the album was nominated for Highest Selling Album.

Track listing

Charts

Weekly charts

Year-end charts

Certifications

Release history

References

1995 compilation albums
John Williamson (singer) compilation albums
EMI Records compilation albums